This is a list of some notable authors in the western fiction genre.

Note that some writers listed below have also written in other genres.

 

A
Edward Abbey (1927–1989)
Andy Adams (1859–1935)
Rudolfo Anaya (1937–2020)

B
Todhunter Ballard (1903–1980)
S. Omar Barker (1894–1985)
Rex Beach (1877–1949)
James Warner Bellah (1899–1976)
Don Bendell (born 1947)
Tom W. Blackburn (1913–1992)
William Blinn (1937–2020)
Stephen Bly (1944–2011)
Frank Bonham (1914–1988)
Allan R. Bosworth (1901–1986)
Peter Bowen (1945–2020)
B.M. Bower (1871–1940), (pseudonym of Bertha "Muzzy" Sinclair)
Leigh Brackett (1915–1978)
Max Brand (1892–1944), (pseudonym of Frederick Schiller Faust)
Lyle Brandt (1951–2021), (pseudonym of Michael Newton)
Peter Brandvold, (pseudonym, Frank Leslie)
Matt Braun (born 1932)
Dee Brown (1908–2002)
Anthony Burgess (1917–1993)
Walter Noble Burns (1866–1932)

C
David Wynford Carnegie (1871–1900)
David F. Case (1937–2018)
Forrest Carter (1925–1979)
Willa Cather (1873–1947)
Robert W. Chambers (Robert William Chambers) (1865–1933)
A.M. Chisholm (1871–1960)
Walter van Tilburg Clark (1909–1971)
Robbie Coburn (born 1994)
Walt Coburn (1889–1971)
Don Coldsmith (1926–2009)
Jackson Cole, (pseudonym of Peter B. Germano)
Ralph Compton (1934–1999)
Robert J. Conley (1940–2014)
Will Cook (William Everett Cook) (1921–1964)
Courtney Ryley Cooper (1886–1940)
James Fenimore Cooper (1789–1851)
Barry Cord, (pseudonym of Peter B. Germano)
Ralph Cotton
William R. Cox (1901–1988)
Bill Crider (1941–2018)
Elizabeth Crook (born 1959)
William Everett Cook (1921–1964)
Daniel Carlson  (born 1963)

D
Sandra Dallas 
H. L. Davis (1894–1960)
J. Frank Dobie (1888–1964)
Gary Dobbs (born 1965)
Ivan Doig (1939–2015)
Harry Sinclair Drago

E
J. T. Edson (1928–2014)
Edward S. Ellis (Edward Sylvester Ellis) (1840–1916)
Louise Erdrich
Loren D. Estleman (born 1952)
Wade Everett, (pseudonym of Will Cook, Giles A. Lutz)

F
Edna Ferber  (1885–1968)
Norman A. Fox (1911–1960)
Ron Franscell (born 1957)

G
Brian Garfield (1939–2018) 
Kathleen O'Neal Gear (born 1954)
W. Michael Gear (born 1955)
George G. Gilman, (pseudonym of Terry Williams Harknett) (1936–2019)
Jean Giraud (1938–2012)
Arthur Henry Gooden (1879–1971)
Edward Gorman (1941–2016)
Jackson Gregory (1882–1943)
Dorien Grey
Zane Grey (1872–1939)
James J. Griffin (born 1949)
Jesse Edward Grinstead (1866–1948)
Fred Grove (1913–2008)
Frank Gruber (1904–1969)
A.B. Guthrie, Jr. (1901–1991)

H
Derek Haas (born 1970)
Mel Hague
William Wister Haines (1908–1989)
Oakley Hall (1920–2008)
Bret Harte (1836–1902)
Kent Haruf (1943–2014)
Ernest Haycox (1899–1950)
Will Henry (Henry Wilson Allen) (1912–1991)
Tony Hillerman (1925–2008)
Lee Hoffman (1932–2007)
Robert E. Howard (1906–1936)
Clair Huffaker (1926–1990)

J
Will James, (1892–1942)
Dorothy M. Johnson (1905–1984)
Terry C. Johnston (1947–2001)
William W. Johnstone (1938–2004)
E.Z.C. Judson, (pseudonym of Ned Buntline)

K
Jim Kane (pseudonym of Peter B. Germano)
Mike Kearby
Elmer Kelton (1926–2009)
Charles King (1844–1933)

L
Oliver La Farge (1901–1963)
Louis L'Amour (1908–1988)
Marcial Lafuente Estefanía (1903–1984), (his pen name, M.L. Estefanía, was later borrowed by his sons)
Joe R. Lansdale (born 1951)
Elmore Leonard (1925–2013)
Chuck Lewis (born 1936)
Tom Lin (born )
Jake Logan (author)
Milton Lott (1919–1996)
Giles A. Lutz (1910–1982)
Francis Lynde (1856–1930)
Stan Lynde

M
Milo Manara (born 1945)
Kat Martin
Richard Matheson (1926–2013)
Karl May (1842–1912)
Ardath Mayhar (1930–2012)
Cormac McCarthy (born 1933)
Lucile Saunders McDonald (1898–1992)
Michael McGarrity (born 1939)
Thomas McGuane (born 1939)
Larry McMurtry (1936–2021)
Leonard Frank Meares
Joaquin Miller (1837–1913)
Lorin Morgan-Richards (born 1975)
Clarence Edward Mulford (1883–1956)

N
John D. Nesbitt (born 1948)
Frederick Nolan (1931–2022)
Frank Norris (1870–1902)
Andre Norton (1912–2005)
Nelson Nye (Nelson C.(Coral) Nye) (1907–1997)

O
Chad Oliver (1928–1993)
T.V. Olsen (Theodore V. Olsen) (1932–1993)
Frank O'Rourke (1906–1989)
Wayne D. Overholser (1906–1996)

P
Lauran Paine (1916–2001)
Robert B. Parker (1932–2010)
Lewis B. Patten (1915–1981)
Charles Portis (1933–2020)
Bill Pronzini (born 1943)
Annie Proulx (born 1935)

R
William MacLeod Raine (1871–1954)
Robert J Randisi (born 1951)
James Reasoner (born 1953)
John H. Reese (1910–1981), (pseudonyms Eddie Abbott, John Jo Carpenter, Camford Cheavly, Camford Sheaveley & Camford Sheavely (chron.))  
Conrad Richter (1890–1968)
Lucia St. Clair Robson (born 1942)
Dana Fuller Ross (born 1953)
Zola Helen Ross (1912–1989)

S
Jeff Sadler (1943–2005), (pseudonym of Geoffrey Sadler; also wrote under the pen name Wes Calhoun).
M.H. Salmon (1945-2019)
Jack Schaefer (1907–1991)
Jon Sharpe
Luke Short (1908–1975), (pseudonym of Frederick D. Glidden)
Jack Slade (publisher house name, pseudonym of Peter B. Germano and others)
Frank H. Spearman (1859–1937)
Kai Starr (born 1964)
John Steinbeck (1902–1968)
Wallace Stegner (1909–1993)
Louis J. Stellman (1877–1961)
Manning Lee Stokes (1911–1976), writing as Ford Worth
Charles S. Strong
Gary Svee (1943–2019)
Glendon Swarthout (1918–1992)

T
Robert Lewis Taylor (1912–1998)
David Thompson
Harlan Howard Thompson
Nye Tredgold
Clay Turner, (pseudonym of Peter B. Germano)
Mark Twain (1835–1910)

V
Robert Vaughan
Gerald Vizenor, (born 1934)

W
Dale L. Walker (1935–2015)
Charles Marquis Warren (1912–1990)
Larry Watson (writer) (born 1947)
Richard S. Wheeler (1935–2019)
Harry Whittington (1915–1989)
G. Clifton Wisler (1950–2006)
Owen Wister (1860–1938)
Richard Wormser (1908–1977)

Z
S. Craig Zahler (born 1973)

Notes

See also
Western fiction
Western movie
List of authors
Western Writers of America
Western lifestyle

Lists of writers
 List